Jolgeh-ye Khalaj-e Sofla (also Romanized as Jolgeh-ye Khalaj-e Soflá; also known as Jolgeh-ye Khalaj, Julgai, Jolgeh Khalaj, and Jolgeh-ye Khalaj-e Pā’īn) is a village in Malavi Rural District, in the Central District of Pol-e Dokhtar County, Lorestan Province, Iran. At the 2006 census, its population was 284, in 67 families.

References 

Towns and villages in Pol-e Dokhtar County